Two Pages Reinterpretations is a remix album by 4hero, released in 1999. The album contains tracks from their previous album Two Pages, remixed by other artists, however was preceded by the Japanese-only release Two Pages Remixed featuring many of the same tracks.

Track listing 
 "Planetaria" (Hefner Remix)  – 6:18
 "We Who Are Not as Others" (Jazzanova Remix)  – 7:07
 "Mathematical Probability" (Mustang Remix)  – 5:43
 "Escape That" (New Sector Movements Selekshan 2 Sector Rub Remix)  – 9:38
 "Escape That" (Off World Remix)  – 6:41
 "Dauntless" (Restless Soul South Pacific Remix)  – 4:50
 "Starchasers" (Masters at Work Main Mix)  – 10:53
 "Star Chasers" (Azymuth Remix)  – 6:18
 "The Action" (Shawn J Period Remix)  – 3:49
 "We Who Are Not as Others" (Alpha Omega Remix)  – 6:39
 "We Who Are Not as Others" (Sonar Circle Remix)  – 7:22

References

4hero albums
1999 compilation albums
Electronica compilation albums
Talkin' Loud albums